Matsucoccidae is a family of scales and mealybugs in the order Hemiptera. There are at least 2 genera and more than 40 described species in Matsucoccidae.

Genera
These two genera belong to the family Matsucoccidae:
 Matsucoccus Cockerell, 1909
 † Eomatsucoccus Koteja, 1988

References

Further reading

 

Scale insects
Hemiptera families